Szeremle (Croatian: Srimljan) is a  village in Bács-Kiskun county, in the Southern Great Plain region of southern Hungary.

Geography

Demographics
  Magyars 
  Croats

References

Populated places in Bács-Kiskun County